Frances is a French and English given name of Latin origin. In Latin the meaning of the name Frances is 'from France' or 'free one.' The male version of the name in English is Francis. The original Franciscus, meaning "Frenchman", comes from the Franks who were named for the francisca, the axe they used in battle. 

Notable people and characters with the name include:

People
 Frances, Countess of Périgord (died 1481)
 Frances (musician) (born 1993), British singer and songwriter
 Frances Estill Beauchamp (1860-1923), American temperance activist, social reformer, lecturer
 Frances Burke, Countess of Clanricarde (1567–1633), English noblewoman and Irish countess
 Frances E. Burns (1866-1937), American social leader and business executive
 Frances Carr, Countess of Somerset (1590–1632), central figure in a famous scandal and murder
 Frances Lewis Brackett Damon (1857–1939), American poet, writer
 Frances Davidson, Viscountess Davidson (1894–1985), British politician and Member of Parliament
 Frances Grey, Duchess of Suffolk (1517–1559), granddaughter of Henry VII of England and mother of Queen Jane Grey
 Frances Haugen, American data engineer and scientist, product manager, and whistleblower
 Frances Hyde, Countess of Clarendon (c. 1617–1667), mother-in-law of King James II of England and maternal grandmother of Mary II and Queen Anne
 Frances Newton, Lady Cobham (1539–1592), one of the closest friends of Queen Elizabeth I of England
 Frances Radclyffe, Countess of Sussex (1531–1589), Lady of the Bedchamber to Queen Elizabeth I
 Frances Seymour, Duchess of Somerset (1599–1674), English noblewoman
 Frances Stewart, Duchess of Richmond, as known as 'La Belle Stuart', the face of Britannia
 Frances Talbot, Countess of Tyrconnell (c. 1647–1730), English courtier and Irish countess
 Frances Vane, Viscountess Vane (1715–1788), British memoirist known for her highly public adulterous relationships
 Frances Waldegrave, Countess Waldegrave (1821–1879), a leader and hostess of society
 Frances Atkins, British chef
 Frances Barkman (1885–1946), Russian-born Australian schoolteacher and Jewish community worker
 Frances Catherine Barnard (1796–1869), English author
 Frances Elizabeth Barrow (1822–1894), American children's writer 	
 Frances Black (born 1960), Irish singer
 Frances Manwaring Caulkins (1795–1869), American historian, genealogist, author
 Frances Bean Cobain (born 1992), American artist, daughter of Nirvana frontman Kurt Cobain and singer Courtney Love
 Frances Augusta Hemingway Conant (1842–1903), American journalist, editor, businesswoman 	
 Frances Conroy, American actress
 Frances Cornford (1886–1960), English poet
 Frances Dickinson (1856–1945), American physician, clubwoman
 Frances Dodge (1914–1971), American internationally known horsewoman
 Frances Scott Fitzgerald (1921–1986), American journalist
 Frances Burney (1752–1840), English novelist, diarist and playwright
 Frances Hodgson Burnett (1849–1924), English playwright and author
 Frances Farmer, American actress
 Frances Fisher, American actress
 Frances FitzGerald (journalist) (born 1940), American journalist and author
 Frances Fitzgerald (politician) (born 1950), Irish Fine Gael politician
 Frances Forbes-Robertson (1866–1956), British novelist
 Frances X. Frei, American academic and businesswoman
 Frances Elizabeth Fryatt, American author, editor, specialist in household applied arts 	
 Frances Nimmo Greene (1867-1937), American educator and author
 Frances Irene Burge Griswold (1826–1900), American poet, author 	
 Frances Ridley Havergal (1836–1879), English hymnwriter, religious poet
 Frances C. Jenkins (1826-1915), American evangelist, Quaker minister, and social reformer
 Frances Benjamin Johnston (1864–1952), American photographer and photojournalist
 Frances Môn Jones (1919–2000), Welsh harpist and teacher
 Frances Kirwan (born 1959), British mathematician
 Frances Latham (1610–1677), colonial woman in Rhode Island known as "the Mother of Governors" for having 10 governors among her direct descendants
 Frances Lupton (1821–1892), English reformer for female education
 Frances MacDonald (1873–1921), Scottish artist
 Frances Harrison Marr (1835–1918), American poet
 Frances McDormand (born 1957), American actress
 Frances McKee (born 1966), Scottish musician, guitarist for Scottish indie band The Vaselines
 Frances Gertrude McGill (1882–1959), pioneering Canadian forensic pathologist and criminologist
 Frances Laughton Mace (1836–1899), American poet 	
 Frances Margaret Milne (1846–?), Irish-born American writer and librarian
 Frances Nelson (1761–1831), wife of Admiral Horatio Nelson
 Frances Osborne (born 1969), British author
 Frances Perkins  (1880–1965), the U.S. Secretary of Labor from 1933 to 1945, the longest serving in that position, and the first woman appointed to the U.S. Cabinet
 Frances Folsom Cleveland Preston (1864–1947), wife of US President Grover Cleveland
 Frances Quinlan, American musician
 Frances of Rome (1384–1440), Italian saint, mystic, organizer of charitable services and Benedictine oblate who founded a religious community of oblates
 Frances Rutherford (1912–2006), New Zealand artist and occupational therapist
 Frances Schreuder (1938–2004), American murderer in the Franklin Bradshaw murder. 
 Frances Alice Shepherd, Canadian academic 
 Frances Lee Strong or Grandma Lee (1934–2020), American comedian
 Frances T. Sullivan, New York State assemblywoman 1991–2002
 Frances Shand Kydd (1936–2004), British viscountess, mother of Diana, Princess of Wales
 Frances Sweeney (1908–1944), American journalist and anti-fascist activist 
 Francie Swift, born Frances Swift, American actress
 Frances Tiafoe, (male) American tennis player
 Frances Christine Fisher Tiernan (1846–1920), American novelist and author under the pen name Christian Reid
 Frances Trollope (1779–1863), English novelist and writer, mother of novelist and writer Anthony Trollope
 Frances Eleanor Trollope (1835–1913), sister of Ellen Ternan (Charles Dickens' mistress) and sister-in-law of Anthony Trollope
 Frances Willard (1839–1898), American educator, temperance reformer and women's suffragist
 Frances Yip, Hong Kong singer
 Frances (Fanny) Brawne (1800–1865), fiancée of Romantic poet John Keats
 Frances Xavier Cabrini (1850–1917), Italian-American Roman Catholic nun and saint

Fictional characters
 Frances, the title character in the children's book series by Russell Hoban
 Frances Earnshaw, from the novel Wuthering Heights
 Frances "Baby" Houseman (portrayed by Jennifer Grey), from the movie Dirty Dancing
 Frances, in the anime Sonic X
 Frances "Franny" Glass, from Franny and Zooey
 Mary Frances "Francie" Nolan, from A Tree Grows in Brooklyn by Betty Smith
 Frances Stevens, played by Grace Kelly in Hitchcock's To Catch a Thief
 Frances Ha, the title character, played by Greta Gerwig, in the 2012 American black and white comedy-drama film, Frances Ha
 Frances "Frankie" Heck, played by Patricia Heaton on the ABC sitcom The Middle
 Frances the Firefly, the protagonist in a fire safety public information film

See also
 Francie
 Frannie

References

Feminine given names
French feminine given names
English feminine given names